Lindquistoseius is a genus of mites in the family Ologamasidae.

References

Ologamasidae
Articles created by Qbugbot